There are five pieces of downloadable content (DLC) for the Bethesda action role-playing video game Fallout 3. Each package of downloadable content adds new missions, new locales to visit, and new items for the player to use. Of the five, Broken Steel has the largest effect on the game, altering the ending, increasing the level cap to 30, and allowing the player to continue playing past the end of the main quest line. The Game of The Year edition of Fallout 3 includes the full game and all five pieces of downloadable content.

The downloadable content was originally only available for Xbox Live and Games for Windows. Although Bethesda had not offered an explanation as to why the content was not released for PlayStation 3, Lazard Capital Markets analyst Colin Sebastian speculated that it may have been the result of a money deal with Bethesda by Sony's competitor, Microsoft. When asked if the PlayStation 3 version would receive an update that would enable gameplay beyond the main quest's completion, Todd Howard responded, "Not at this time, no". However, in May 2009, Bethesda announced that the existing DLC packs (Operation: Anchorage, The Pitt and Broken Steel) would be made available for the PlayStation 3; the later two (Point Lookout and Mothership Zeta) were released for all platforms.

Operation: Anchorage
Operation: Anchorage is the first Fallout 3 downloadable content pack, and takes place as a virtual reality "military simulation" in the main game where the player character is stripped of their equipment and is forced to use the replacements provided. The content focuses on the titular event in Fallouts alternate history. Before the Great War, the United States Army liberated Anchorage, Alaska from Chinese forces. The pack contains several new quests, new items, and adds four new achievements. Gameplay within the simulation is different than the main game; health and ammo are replenished by stations in certain areas of the simulation world, items functionally do not suffer from decay, and enemy corpses disappear instead of allowing the player to loot them for supplies.

Operation: Anchorage was released in North America and Europe on January 27, 2009 on Xbox Live and Games for Windows Live. Although the content was scheduled for release on the PlayStation 3 in June 2009, the final week of June's PlayStation Store updates did not include it. Bethesda released information suggesting that the delay was due to their desire to iron out all of the bugs before release as well as test compatibility between DLCs. Operation: Anchorage, along with The Pitt, were released on October 1, 2009, for PS3.

Plot
The Brotherhood of Steel Outcasts are trying to acquire a stash of pre-war technology in a bunker near the metro. However, the armory can only be unlocked with a code, and the code can only be obtained from a virtual reality simulation of one of the greatest battles of the Fallout universe: the liberation of Anchorage, Alaska from invading Chinese troops. The Outcasts cannot use the simulation because an external interface device, the player's Pip-Boy, is required. The player is recruited to complete the simulation in return for a share of the reward.

In the simulation, the player is tasked with fighting the Chinese in various scenarios, such as clearing out bunkers in a cliff, hitting strategic targets, and finally defeating the Chinese general in single combat. Once the simulation is complete, the player gains access to the armory and the advanced weapons it contains. Upon opening the door and took their rewards, the Lone Wanderer witness an argument between Outcast Commander McGraw and Defender Sibley who refused the former for sharing the equipment to the Wanderer. The player could save McGraw or leave him to die at the hands of Sibley. After which, Sibley and his followers would attempt to kill the player.

Reception
Both the PC and the Xbox 360 version of the Operation: Anchorage DLC received mixed reviews from critics, averaging a 67 and a 69 respectively at Metacritic. Several reviewers criticized Operation: Anchorage for being too expensive for the content provided. Play.tm's Richard Bright and other reviewers were disappointed overall, with Bright stating "this episode was a little disappointing for me personally." Game Over's Phil Soletsky was particularly critical of the expansion's story, saying "I had been hoping that the liberation of Alaska would be a massive affair involving battalions of soldiers hammering away at each other." IGN's Erik Brudvig gave high praise to the new weapon, the gauss rifle, calling it "freakin' awesome". Reviewers also criticized the shift to a focus on action gameplay, instead of the more varied gameplay that Fallout 3 had.

The Pitt
The Pitt is the second downloadable content pack. It allows the player to journey to the industrial raider town known as The Pitt, in the remains of Pittsburgh, Pennsylvania. The pack features several new weapons, new armor and clothing items, four achievements and around four to five hours of gameplay. The Pitt was released on March 24, 2009 on Xbox Live and Games for Windows Live, but was quickly removed due to glitches in the gameplay which made the Xbox 360 version of the expansion unplayable. Further investigation was performed by Bethesda and Microsoft, and on March 25, 2009, the expansion was again uploaded to Xbox Live, and was made available again that afternoon. For those who downloaded it on March 24 in the morning, glitches were still apparent. A new version was available on Xbox Live on April 2, fixing freezing issues many players had encountered with the previous version. A retail disk was released at the end of May 2009 containing this and the Operation: Anchorage downloadable content. It was released for Xbox 360 and Games for Windows. The downloadable content is copied to the hard drive and functions as it would have had it been downloaded. This pack was released for the PlayStation 3 at the same time as Operation Anchorage on October 1, 2009.

Plot

Pittsburgh, Pennsylvania, although not hit directly by atomic bombs during the Great War, was afflicted by the highly irradiated water of the nearby Allegheny, Monongahela, and Ohio rivers, resulting in the decay of the region. The inhabitants suffer from extreme radiation poisoning and degenerate into mindless creatures. The entire population are either slaves or overseers.

Some 30 years before the Lone Wanderer started their journey, Owyn Lyons led the Brotherhood of Steel's expedition to Washington, D.C. through The Pitt. In one night, the Brotherhood swept through and destroyed the raider force occupying the town and rid the surrounding area of other "scum", killing anything that put up a fight. This event is chronicled as "the Scourge". As they cut through the raiders, the Brotherhood saved several young children, among them Paladin Kodiak, who had not yet been mutated to the extent of The Pitt's adult inhabitants. All the rescued children were brought into the Brotherhood of Steel as initiates. Paladin Kodiak is the only remaining survivor from that group of rescued children who is still stationed at the Citadel.

The Lone Wanderer learns of the Pitt from a distress broadcast by a man named Wernher, who asks for the Wanderer's help in liberating the slaves there. The player has to enter the Pitt as a slave and work their way to freedom. This earns a meeting with the Pitt's leader, Lord Ashur, a former Brotherhood soldier left for dead during the Scourge. The player is then given the choice of siding with either Wernher or Ashur. Unlike other decisions in Fallout 3, there is no karmic penalty or reward for choosing either side, as each side has both its good and bad points.

Reception
The Pitt received generally positive reviews, averaging a score of 77 for the PC version and 76 for the Xbox 360 version. When initially released, the Xbox 360 version had a corrupt file which caused problems and rendered the DLC unplayable. On April 3, 2009, Bethesda Softworks reported that they had uploaded a new version of The Pitt which fixed these problems. The PC version of The Pitt had the same problem, leading modders to create a patch called "The Pitt Crash Fix" which fixes the problems present in the wasteland but not interiors of The Pitt.

Broken Steel
Broken Steel is the third and most significant downloadable content pack, altering the original ending of Fallout 3 and allowing the player to continue playing past the end of the main quest line. If the player personally activates Project Purity, their character no longer dies but instead wakes up after a two-week coma to join the ranks of the Brotherhood of Steel and helps rid the Capital Wasteland of the Enclave once and for all. The pack raises the game's level cap from 20 to 30. It includes three main quests and three side-quests. Three Dog has new dialogue in this expansion, but no new songs are added. The new weapons in Broken Steel, including the Tesla Cannon, are some of the most powerful weapons in Fallout 3.

Broken Steel was released on May 5, 2009 on Xbox Live and Games for Windows – Live (GFWL). It was quickly removed from GFWL due to bugs which made the PC version of the expansion unplayable, and rereleased two days later. Some Xbox 360 users reported a bug that prevents them from activating Project Purity, resulting in the plot elements added by the DLC being inaccessible. PC users reported that changes caused by Broken Steel and the 1.5 patch adversely affect mods to the game.

This pack was the first released for PlayStation 3 due to it being the most requested DLC for Fallout 3. This is primarily due to the continuation of the story past the game's original ending, and for the raise in the level cap from level 20 to 30, as many complained that the cap could be reached far too quickly in playing the game's main campaign. Bethesda announced on their website that "The first DLC for PlayStation 3, Broken Steel, [was] made available on September 24 in English territories and will be followed by the release of Operation: Anchorage and The Pitt on October 1, and Point Lookout and Mothership Zeta on October 8."

Plot

Broken Steel alters the ending of the original Fallout 3 to allow continued play after the end of the main quest line. When the player reaches the final point of the quest "Take it Back!", new options are given to allow specific followers to enter the reactor, but the original options still remain viable. Regardless of what is chosen, however, the player will wake up two weeks later at the Citadel (unless they allow the Purifier to explode, which automatically ends the game), having been knocked unconscious by an unknown radiation spike. Sarah Lyons will also be in a coma, unless she activated the purifier, in which case she will have died.

In the two weeks since the activation of the purifier, the Brotherhood has been using the now-reactivated Liberty Prime to root out the remaining Enclave presence in the Capital Wasteland. The player joins them, only to watch Liberty Prime be destroyed by a devastating orbital strike. Taking out this new threat becomes the top priority. A short side-mission is arranged to equip the player with the powerful Tesla Cannon, after which they move on the Enclave's massive Mobile Crawler base, located outside of the Wasteland at Adams Air Force Base. After fighting through the base personnel, a control station at the top can be used to call an orbital strike on the base itself, destroying it. Alternatively, the Citadel can be destroyed, branding the Lone Wanderer a traitor to the Brotherhood.

Reception
Broken Steel received positive reactions, averaging an 81 for the PC and an 82 for the Xbox 360. The Sacramento Bee wrote "The previous two downloadable expansions are good, but this one's pretty much essential for a Fallout 3 fan". IGN mirrored this view by stating "Lifting the level cap breathes new life into a great game, but shouldn't totally overshadow a new series of quests that is a lot of fun." Edge, on the other hand, while commenting that "it's the most you're going to get out of Fallouts current batch of DLC", felt that "it lacks the scope or density of The Elder Scrolls IV: Oblivions The Shivering Isles". The A.V. Club commented that "After deflating the finality of the original ending, Broken Steel is unsure what to do next, beyond sending you on a few entertaining but hollow missions to snuff out the remnants of the para-military Enclave. Thankfully, the expansion's B-story is more thoughtful, as it plunges into the chaos and profiteering that result when a limited supply of clean water starts flowing into the Wasteland".

In their end of year awards special, IGN named Broken Steel Best Expansion for the PC.

Point Lookout
Point Lookout is the fourth downloadable content pack, and takes place in Point Lookout State Park in Maryland. No bombs were dropped on Point Lookout, but it has nonetheless degenerated into a place just as unforgiving as the Capital Wasteland. Humanity has left it behind and it is described as a large swamp wasteland. This pack has new enemies called swampfolk, who are inbred hillbillies that attack with weapons such as axes, shovels, and double-barreled shotguns. Unlike the previous content packs, which added additional landmarks to the main map (Broken Steel added two very limited maps), or had new maps with restricted exploration capabilities, Point Lookout has a fully explorable wasteland. Point Lookout was released on June 23, 2009 for the Xbox 360 and the PC and on October 8, 2009 for the PlayStation 3.

Plot
Point Lookout, unlike the other DLCs, does not have a specific goal. Rather, it adds a large area for the player to explore, with new enemies, such as swamp mirelurks, and swampfolk, as well as items to find, such as the lever-action rifle, axe, and double-barreled shotgun. One major quest line focuses on the rivalry between Desmond Lockheart and Professor Calvert, two scientists who have been feuding since before the Great War. Desmond has survived as a ghoul, while Calvert became a living brain. The feud can be ended by the Lone Wanderer in either Desmond's or Calvert's favor. Other quests include following the trail of a long-dead Chinese spy and discovering the mystery of the Lovecraftian tome known as the Krivbeknih.

Reception
Point Lookout received generally positive reviews, averaging a 79 for the PC and an 83 for the Xbox 360. Eurogamer stated "Like a compacted version of its parent game, this is the first DLC that has felt like a genuine expansion, as opposed to a just a few inconsequential missions thrown together." IGN noted that "[t]he stories and characters here are filled with that trademark Fallout dark humor, elevating these quests to a level that rivals the main game" and that "[t]he major draw to Point Lookout... is its emphasis on exploration." Edge calls it "the best expansion so far and the game at its worst," stating "if you want a microcosm of Fallout 3, equal parts adventuring, grinding, questing and scavenging, you might just think it the best expansion so far". Edge goes on to criticize Point Lookout for using "a lot of what you might call 'economy content' in Point Lookout: recycled enemies, text journals, variant weapons, and bogus forks in the storyline."

Mothership Zeta
Mothership Zeta is the fifth and final downloadable content pack, and follows the main character after being abducted by aliens when going to explore a mysterious radio transmission from the Alien Crash Site. It takes place on an alien spacecraft, is a similar size to Operation: Anchorage, and has a similar emphasis on combat as that DLC had. It was released on August 3, 2009 for the Xbox 360 and PC and on October 8, 2009 for the PlayStation 3, along with Point Lookout. This expansion is a first for the series, as it explores an easter egg, specifically the crashed alien spacecraft that can be found in Fallout 3 and the original Fallout.

Plot
The Lone Wanderer receives an unintelligible radio transmission which leads them to the alien crash site. Upon approaching the wreckage, they are beamed into an alien mothership, Mothership Zeta, where they meet other prisoners who have been abducted over the centuries. The player is relieved of their equipment and locked in a cell with another abductee named Somah. With the help of Somah, a little girl named Sally, and a few unlikely allies from several different time periods, the Lone Wanderer must fight their way to the bridge of the ship and defeat the alien captain.

Once the captain is defeated, the abductees take control of the mothership to battle another hostile alien vessel. The Lone Wanderer controls the death ray in the battle. Once the enemy ship is defeated, the Lone Wanderer becomes the captain of the ship and can return at will, though most of the ship is locked down after the battle.

Reception
Mothership Zeta received mixed reactions from critics, averaging a 70 for the PC and a 65 for the Xbox 360. Edge comments that "Mothership Zetas greatest asset is its looks" and that "whoever designed such beauty should be pretty peeved at the game around it". Edge also noted that they "encountered a script bug so catastrophic that we couldn't finish the game – we actually had to clip through a doorway and use console commands to bring everything back on track" and criticized the DLC for locking off most of the ship after completion. Eurogamer states that "the most disappointing factor about Mothership Zeta is how little subtlety is afforded to the details" and sums up the DLC as "repetitive, largely uninspired corridor combat, and boring, linear and samey mission design." Gamedaily praises Mothership Zeta for "keep[ing] Fallouts trademark humor intact", its improved graphics, and for the new enemies and weapons introduced.

References

External links
Fallout 3 official website
Fallout 3 on Nukapedia, a Fallout wiki
 Fallout 3 Portal the Vault Fallout wiki
 

2009 video games
Episodic video games
Fallout (series) video games
Gamebryo games
Games for Windows certified games
PlayStation 3 games
Windows games
Xbox 360 games
Lists of video game downloadable content
Bethesda Game Studios games
Video games developed in the United States
Video games featuring protagonists of selectable gender
Video games set in Pittsburgh
Video game downloadable content